Aralluy-e Bozorg (also Romanized as Ārāllūy-e Bozorg; also known as Ārāllū-ye Bozorg, Bīlah Daraq, and Bīlah Daraq-e Fūlādlū) is a village in Fuladlui-ye Shomali Rural District of Hir District, Ardabil County, Ardabil province, Iran. At the 2006 census, its population was 2,276 in 448 households. The following census in 2011 counted 2,567 people in 655 households. The latest census in 2016 showed a population of 2,650 people in 727 households; it is the largest village in its rural district.

References 

Ardabil County

Towns and villages in Ardabil County

Populated places in Ardabil Province

Populated places in Ardabil County